Sehjowal railway station (Urdu and ) is located in Sehjowal village, Kasur district of Punjab province, Pakistan.

See also
 List of railway stations in Pakistan
 Pakistan Railways

References

External links

Railway stations in Kasur District
Defunct railway stations in Pakistan
Railway stations on Karachi–Peshawar Line (ML 1)